Bohadschia argus, the leopard sea cucumber, leopardfish, or tigerfish, is a species of marine invertebrate in the family Holothuriidae.

Description

It is a greyish-brown colour, paler below, with distinctive dark eye-spots 
There are several rows of tube feet on the underside. Surrounding the mouth at the anterior end is a ring of paddle-shaped, black tentacles fringed with white. The anus, at the posterior end, has Cuvierian tubules situated at its base which are readily ejected as sticky threads if the animal is disturbed or handled. These contain toxins which deter predators and are irritating to human skin.

Bohadschia argus appears to be able to hybridize with Bohadschia vitiensis.

Distribution and habitat
Bohadschia argus is found in the eastern Indian Ocean and the western Pacific Ocean.

Biology
Bohadschia argus is an omnivore. As it moves across the seabed, it sweeps sand grains and detritus into its mouth using its sticky tentacles. It obtains some nourishment from the biofilm that coats the grains.

Ecology
Fish of the species Carapus mourlani are sometimes found living in the coelomic cavity of Bohadschia argus; the fish enter through the anus, either going in head first or more frequently tail first. In a study in the Banda Islands in the South Moluccan Sea, 15 individual fish were found to be inhabiting the body of one sea cucumber  in length.

The small emperor shrimp (Periclimenes imperator) is often associated with Bohadschia argus and may help keep it clear of ectoparasites.

Uses
A new triterpene glycoside, Arguside A, has been extracted from the tissues of Bohadschia argus. This compound appears to exhibit cytotoxicity against several different types of human tumour cells.

References

External links
 

Holothuriidae
Fauna of the Indian Ocean
Fauna of the Pacific Ocean
Animals described in 1833